Daphne Cérès Jongejans (born 22 June 1965 in Badhoevedorp, North Holland) is a retired female diver from the Netherlands, who represented her native country at three consecutive Summer Olympics: 1984, 1988 and 1992.

Background 
Jongejans' best Olympic performance was finishing in eighth place at the 1988 Summer Olympics, in the women's 3 metres springboard event. Her younger brother Edwin was also a well-known international diver. He won the world title in the men's 1 metre springboard event at the 1991 World Aquatic Championships in Perth, Western Australia.

She is a graduate of the University of Miami, and is in their sports hall of fame.

She is married to Scott Bousquet and has two children. She resides outside of Atlanta, Georgia and works as an event planner.

References

External links

1965 births
Living people
Dutch female divers
Divers at the 1984 Summer Olympics
Divers at the 1988 Summer Olympics
Divers at the 1992 Summer Olympics
Olympic divers of the Netherlands
People from Haarlemmermeer
Miami Hurricanes women's divers
Sportspeople from North Holland
20th-century Dutch women